Huntdown (sometimes stylized as HUNTDOWN) is a 2020 run-and-gun video game developed by Easy Trigger and published by Coffee Stain Publishing. It was released for Microsoft Windows, macOS, PlayStation 4, Xbox One and Nintendo Switch in May 2020. The game was later ported to Android and iOS in May 2021.

Gameplay 
The player-character is one of three characters, a cyborg, human or robot, who fights criminals. The levels end when the player defeats a boss.

Reception 

Huntdown received "generally favorable" reviews, according to review aggregator Metacritic.

Chris Moyse of Destructoid remarked, "Easy Trigger has sculptured its love letter to '80s grindhouse to hit players like a sledgehammer, bombarding them with amazing old-school visuals, fantastic sound, great music, and just enough retro-chic to pay homage to its source material". 

PJ O'Reilly of Nintendo Life stated, "Huntdown is a delightfully detailed and expertly crafted throwback to old-school run n' gun arcade shooters. The 16-bit graphical style is immaculately recreated whilst adding lots of modern bells and whistles to proceedings, including a fantastic soundtrack and audio design".

Stefano Castelli from IGN Italy wrote, "an appreciable and challenging old-fashioned shooter that offers a handful of hours of intense battles, best if played in tandem with a friend." Martin Robinson of Eurogamer said that "Huntdown matches its excess with brilliant detail." and that "it looks frankly spectacular."

Legacy 
In a statement regarding the purchase of Easy Trigger by Coffee Stain Studios, it was stated that the two companies would collaborate to "continue working on the Huntdown IP" although no further details have been provided.

References

External links 
 Huntdown official website

2020 video games
Run and gun games
Retro-style video games
Video games developed in Sweden
Indie video games
Android (operating system) games
IOS games
PlayStation 4 games
MacOS games
Xbox One games
Nintendo Switch games
Windows games
Single-player video games
Cyberpunk video games
Cooperative video games
Dystopian video games
Neo-noir video games
Platform games
Retrofuturistic video games
Science fiction video games
Side-scrolling video games
Video games about cyborgs
Video games about robots
Video games featuring female protagonists